Pyros may refer to:

 Pyros (bomb), a bomb designed for unmanned aerial vehicles
 Pyros (TV series), a Canadian reality TV series
 Pyros, alternate North American title of Wardner (video game)
 Richard Pyros, British actor

See also 
 Pyro (disambiguation)